Stemonaria is a genus of slime molds in the family Amaurochaetaceae. , there are 14 species in the genus.

Species
Stemonaria argentella
Stemonaria clausifila
Stemonaria fuscoides
Stemonaria gracilis
Stemonaria irregularis
Stemonaria laxa
Stemonaria laxiretis
Stemonaria longa
Stemonaria minuta
Stemonaria nannengae
Stemonaria pallidofila
Stemonaria pilosa
Stemonaria reticulospora
Stemonaria rufipes

References

Myxogastria
Amoebozoa genera